This is a list of gold medals games for the IIHF World Junior Championship (World Juniors), an international hockey tournament for players under the age of 20, held each year in late December to early January.

List of finals

References

finals
Ice hockey games